K. K. Dodds (born 1965) is an American actress best known for playing Susan Hollander on the Fox drama Prison Break and for her roles in the films Soldier and A Life Less Ordinary.

Career
She appeared in such television shows as Prison Break, CSI, and NYPD Blue. Dodds also appeared in the film Soldier as Lieutenant Sloan, in Being John Malkovich as Wendy, in A Life Less Ordinary as Lily, in Grosse Pointe Blank as Tracy, and in Spider-Man as Simkins. She has also taken stage roles, including the lead character Frankie K in Chicago's Amerikafka. She also appeared in the 1999 film The Deep End of the Ocean as Pat Cappadora's sister, Teresa "Tree" Cappadora,  alongside Michelle Pfeiffer, Treat Williams (who played Pat), Whoopi Goldberg and Jonathan Jackson.

Filmography

References

External links

1965 births
American film actresses
American television actresses
Living people
Place of birth missing (living people)
21st-century American women